"Stick-Up" is Honey Cone's 1971 follow up single to the #1 pop and R&B hit "Want Ads". It was #1 on the R&B chart for three weeks; on the Hot 100, it peaked at #11.

Chart history

Weekly charts

Year-end charts

References

External links
[ Song overview] on Allmusic

Honey Cone songs
1971 singles
Songs written by General Johnson (musician)
Songs written by Greg Perry (singer)
1971 songs